Clayton Montague Rohner (born August 5, 1957) is an American actor. He made his film debut in the comedy Just One of the Guys (1985), and had subsequent roles in the horror films April Fool's Day (1986), Bat 21 (1988), I, Madman (1989), and The Relic (1997). He had a recurring role on the television series Murder One (1996–1997) and Day Break (2006–2007). In 2017, Rohner guest-starred on the series Ozark.

Biography
Rohner was born August 5, 1957 in Palo Alto, California and raised in Los Angeles. He graduated with a Bachelor of Arts degree in theater from Whitman College, where he was a member of the Beta Theta Pi fraternity.

He is known for his role as Rick Morehouse in the 1985 comedy movie Just One of the Guys.  He also starred in the 1986 film Modern Girls as Clifford and Bruno X. He is a main character in the 1994 film Caroline at Midnight. Other credits include the films April Fool's Day, Destroyer, The Relic, and The Human Centipede 3 (Final Sequence). Clayton starred in the short-lived science fiction series E.A.R.T.H. Force and G vs E. He starred in the 2005 film role in Formosa. 

Rohner appeared on the TV series Murder One as Detective Vince Biggio from 1996 to 1997. His television guest appearances include Miami Vice, Star Trek: The Next Generation, Beverly Hills, 90210, Charmed, Crossing Jordan, Angel, and Weeds.  He also appeared in the award-winning series Into the West and The X-Files (season 6, episode 8). He also appeared in the TV role of Jared Pryor in the short-lived ABC midseason replacement Day Break.

Filmography

References

External links

www.claytonrohner.com

1957 births
Living people
American male film actors
American male television actors
Male actors from Palo Alto, California
20th-century American male actors
21st-century American male actors
Whitman College alumni